Touchstone Theatre is a professional theatre company in Vancouver, British Columbia, Canada, founded in 1976 by a group of University of British Columbia theatre graduates. Touchstone's focus is on the development and production of Canadian works. Since 2016, the Artistic Director has been Roy Surette, who previously held the position in the 1990s. Former Artistic Directors are Ian Fenwick, Gordon McCall, John Cooper and Katrina Dunn, who served in that position from 1997 to 2016.

Activities

Touchstone Theatre's stated mandate is that it "develops and presents professional theatrical productions. We explore the contemporary Canadian play through content and form. We stimulate public interest in Canadian cultural perspectives."

In fulfillment of its mandate, much of Touchstone's activities have fallen into one of three categories: it mounts premiere productions of plays by British Columbian playwrights; it mounts second productions of important plays that premiered in other areas of Canada; and it produces works developed within the company. Touchstone has helped launch and develop the careers of numerous playwrights and actors. Touchstone, with the Playwrights Theatre Centre, also fosters the creation of new works through its "Flying Start" initiative (previously the "Playwright in Residence" program). Under the program, Touchstone spends two years working with a playwright to develop a play through workshops and dramaturgy to production.

Since 2011, in partnership with the Arts Club Theatre Company, Touchstone produces the "In Tune Conference", which supports new Canadian musicals in a national event which takes place every two years.

History

As of its 40th anniversary in the 2015-2016 season, Touchstone will have produced 36 World Premiers and works by 42 Canadian playwrights. Touchstone has helped launch and develop the careers of numerous playwrights and actors.

At the start of the 1997-1998 season, Katrina Dunn succeeded Roy Surette as Artistic Director. Dunn created the "Playwright in Residence" program, which has resulted in many plays, including Kevin Kerr's Governor General's Awards-winning Unity (1918).  In 2010, the Touchstone program focussed on female Canadian playwrights.

In 2003, Touchstone partnered with Rumble Productions to found the PuSh International Performing Arts Festival, a performing arts festival held every January in Vancouver, BC.

Awards
Touchstone's body of work has garnered many awards and nominations, including numerous Jessie Awards. By the end of Touchstone's 38th season in 2014, Touchstone had earned 106 Jessie nominations and won 57 Jessie Awards.

In 2010, Artistic Director Katrina Dunn was recognized by the Women’s Caucus of the Playwrights Guild of Canada, who awarded Dunn with its "Bra D'Or" for supporting and promoting the work of Canadian female playwrights.

Chronology of plays 
Touchstone Theatre had produced the following plays, some in partnership with other theatre companies.

1976/1977
The Exception & the Rule by Bertolt Brecht
The Farce of Pierre Patelin by Anonymous
King Stag by Carlo Gozzi
1977/1978
Faces in the Fast Lane A collective creation
Broken Dolls A collective creation
Gullband by Susan Musgrave
1978/1979
The Unseen Hand by Sam Shepard
Hot Rods & Heavy Water by Michael Puttonen
Angel City by Sam Shepard
1979/1980
HIGHBALL! by Ronald Weihs
1980/1981
Revenge by Howard Brenton
Games by Ivan Klima
1981/1982
The Man Himself by Alan Drury
The Crackwalker by Judith Thompson
1982/1983
The Wolf Boy by Brad Fraser
Clay by Lawrence Jeffery
1983/1984
Children of the Night by Paul Ledoux
Checkin’ Out by Kelly Rebar
1984/1985
Sex Tips for Modern Girls A collective creation
White Biting Dog by Judith Thompson
1985/1986
Going Down for the Count by Peter Eliot Weiss
El Crocodor A collective creation
Nancy Prew: Clue in the Fast Lane by Beverley Cooper
1986/1987
Life Skills by David King
Farther West by John Murrell
1987/1988
Red Channels by Jennifer Martin & Leslie Mildiner
Zaydok by Dennis Foon
Three Penny Opera by Bertolt Brecht & Kurt Weill
1988/1989
Bones by Peter Anderson
Toronto, Mississippi by Joan MacLeod
Jewel by Joan Macleod
Lost Souls & Missing Persons by Sally Clark
1989/1990
Where is Kabuki? by Don Druik
Homework & Curtains by John Lazarus
Local Colour by David King
1990/1991
The Invisible Detective by Peter Eliot Weiss with song by Ken MacDonald and Morris Panych
Unidentified Human Remains & The True Nature of Love by Brad Fraser
1991/1992
Lion in the Streets by Judith Thompson
A Map of Senses by Gordon Armstrong
1992/1993
The Number 14 A collective creation
The Hope Slide by Joan MacLeod
Iceberg Lettuce by Katherine Schlemmer
1993/1994
Whale Riding Weather by Bryden MacDonald
Lilies by Michel Marc Bouchard
WAK! by Sheri-D Wilson and Savannah Walling
1994/1995
The Visit by Friedrich Dürrenmatt
The Erotic Art Show by Kathryn Allison
1995/1996
When We Were Singing by Dorothy Dittrich
The Orphan Muses by Michel Marc Bouchard
1996/1997
Sex in Heaven by Gordon Armstrong
Sled by Judith Thompson
Boy Wonder (In partnership with Ballet British Columbia and Vancouver New Music)
1997/1998
The Weekend Healer by Bryden MacDonald
Grace by Michael Lewis MacLennan
1998/1999
The Good Person of Setzuan by Bertolt Brecht, Marguerite Steffin and Ruth Berlau
Passion by Conrad Alexandrowicz
Cherry Docs by David Gow
1999/2000
It’s All True by Jason Sherman
Je me souviens by Lorena Gale
15 Seconds by François Archambault
2000/2001
Kilt by Jonathan Wilson
Kicked by Michael Healey
Unity(1918) by Kevin Kerr
2001/2002
Sucker Falls by Drew Hayden Taylor
Emphysema by Janet Munsil
Hosanna by Michel Tremblay
2002/2003
Lisa Lisa by Rick Dobran
Apple by Vern Thiessen
The Family Way by Kathleen Oliver
2003/2004
Unity(1918) by Kevin Kerr
The League of Nathans by Jason Sherman
2004/2005
Strawberries in January by Evelyne de la Chenelière
The Trigger by Carmen Aguirre
2005/2006
Little Mercy’s First Murder Book & lyrics by Morwyn Brebner, music by Jay Turvey and Paul Sportelli
Prodigal Son by Shawn Macdonald
2006/2007
Life After God by Michael Lewis MacLennan
Hippies and Bolsheviks by Amiel Gladstone
2007/2008
How It Works by Daniel MacIvor
The Dissemblers by Jason Bryden
Tideline by Wajdi Mouawad, translated by Shelley Tepperman
2008/2009
Age of Arousal by Linda Griffiths
East of Berlin by Hannah Moscovitch
Influence by Janet Munsil
Palace of the End by Judith Thompson
2009/2010
Any Night by Daniel Arnold, Medina Hahn and Ron Jenkins
Demon Night by Shawn Macdonald
Herr Beckmann's People by Sally Stubbs
2010/2011
Mimi (Or A Prisoner's Comedy Lyrics and music by Allen Cole, book and lyrics by Melody A. Johnson and Rick Roberts
Hard Core Logo: Live Adaptation by Michael Scholar, Jr., based on the book by Michael Turner, film by Bruce McDonald, and screenplay by Noel S. Baker. Original Music by Joe Keithley, lyrics by Michael Turner
Love Songs By Ana Sokolovic
2011/2012
Almighty Voice and His Wife by Daniel David Moses
Goodness by Michael Redhill
Shelter from the Storm by Peter Boychuk
True Love Lies by Brad Fraser
2012/2013
Dancing With Rage by Mary Walsh
Eternal Hydra by Anton Piatigorsky
Haunted by Daniel Karasik
In Tune Conference
2013/2014
Hirsh Created by Alon Nashman and Paul Thompson
Night by Christopher Morris
The Concessions by Briana Brown
The Romeo Initiative by Trina Davies
2014/2015
In Tune 2015 
Late Company by Jordan Tannahill
The Road Forward Created by Marie Clements
2019/20
Certified by Jan Derbyshire

References

External links
 Touchstone Theatre website

Arts organizations established in 1976
Theatre companies in British Columbia
Theatre in Vancouver